Work or labor (or labour in British English) is the intentional activity people perform to support the needs and wants of themselves, others, or a wider community. In the context of economics, work can be viewed as the human activity that contributes (along with other factors of production) towards the goods and services within an economy. 

Work is fundamental to all societies, but can vary widely within and between them, from gathering in natural resources by hand, to operating complex technologies that substitute for physical or even mental effort by many human beings. All but the simplest tasks also require specific skills, equipment or tools, and other resources (such as material for manufacturing goods). Cultures and individuals across history have expressed a wide range of attitudes towards work. Outside of any specific process or industry, humanity has developed a variety of institutions for situating work in society.

Besides objective differences, one culture may organize or attach social status to work roles differently from another. Throughout history, work has been intimately connected with other aspects of society and politics, such as power, class, tradition, rights, and privileges. Accordingly, the division of labor is a prominent topic across the social sciences, as both an abstract concept and a characteristic of individual cultures.

Some people have also engaged in critique of work and expressed a wish to abolish it. For example Paul Lafargue in his book The Right to Be Lazy.

Related terms include occupation and job; related concepts are job title and profession.

Description 

Work can take many different forms, as various as the environments, tools, skills, goals, and institutions around a worker.

Because sustained effort is a necessary part of many human activities, what qualifies as work is often a matter of context. Specialization is one common feature that distinguishes work from other activities. For example, a sport is a job for a professional athlete who earns their livelihood from it, but a hobby to someone playing for fun in their community. An element of advance planning or expectation is also common, such as when a paramedic provides medical care while on-duty and fully equipped, rather than performing first aid off-duty as a bystander in an emergency. Self-care and basic habits like personal grooming are also not typically considered work either.

While a later gift, trade, or payment may retroactively affirm an activity as productive, this can exclude work like volunteering or activity within a family setting, like parenting or housekeeping. In some cases, the distinction between work and other activities is simply a matter of common sense within a community. However, an alternative view is that labeling any activity as work is somewhat subjective, such as Mark Twain expressed in the "whitewashed fence" scene of The Adventures of Tom Sawyer.

History 

Humans have varied their work habits and attitudes to work over the course of time. Hunter-gatherer societies vary their "work" intensity according to seasonal availability of plants and the periodic migration of prey animals. The development of agriculture led to more sustained work practices, but work still changed with the seasons, with intense sustained effort during harvests (for example) alternating with less focussed periods such as winters. In the early-modern era, Protestantism and proto-capitalism emphasized the moral/personal advantages of hard work.

The periodic re-invention of slavery encouraged more consistent work activity in the working class, and capitalist industrialization intensified demands on workers to keep up with the pace of machines. Restrictions on the hours of work and the ages of workers followed, with worker demands for time-off increasing, but modern office work retains traces of expectations of sustained, concentrated work, even in affluent societies.

Kinds of work 

There are several ways to categorize and compare different kinds of work. In economics, one popular approach is the three-sector model or variations of it. In this view, an economy can be separated into three broad categories:
 Primary sector, which extracts food, raw materials, and other resources from the environment
 Secondary sector, which manufactures physical products, refines materials, and provides utilities
 Tertiary sector, which provides services and helps administer the economy

In complex economies with high specialization, these categories are further subdivided into industries that produce a focused subset of products or services. Some economists also propose additional sectors such as a "knowledge-based" quaternary sector, but this division is neither standardized nor universally accepted.

Another common way of contrasting work roles is ranking them according to a criterion, such as the amount of skill, experience, or seniority associated with a role. The progression from apprentice through journeyman to master craftsman in the skilled trades is one example with a long history and analogs in many cultures.

Societies also commonly rank different work roles by perceived status, but this is more subjective and goes beyond clear progressions within a single industry. Some industries may be seen as more prestigious than others overall, even if they include roles with similar functions. At the same time, a wide swathe of roles across all industries may be afforded more status (e.g. managerial roles) or less (like manual labor) based on characteristics such as a job being low-paid or dirty, dangerous and demeaning.

Other social dynamics, like how labor is compensated, can even exclude meaningful tasks from a society's conception of work. For example, in modern market-economies where wage labor or piece work predominates, unpaid work may be omitted from economic analysis or even cultural ideas of what qualifies as work.

At a political level, different roles can fall under separate institutions where workers have qualitatively different power or rights. In the extreme, the least powerful members of society may be stigmatized (as in untouchability) or even violently forced (via slavery) into performing the least desirable work. Complementary to this, elites may have exclusive access to the most prestigious work, largely symbolic sinecures, or even a "life of leisure".

Workers 
Individual workers require sufficient health and resources to succeed in their tasks.

Physiology 

As living beings, humans require a baseline of good health, nutrition, rest, and other physical needs in order to reliably exert themselves. This is particularly true of physical labor that places direct demands on the body, but even largely mental work can cause stress from problems like long hours, excessive demands, or a hostile workplace.

Particularly intense forms of manual labor often lead workers to develop physical strength necessary for their job. However, this activity does not necessarily improve a worker's overall physical fitness like exercise, due to problems like overwork or a small set of repetitive motions. In these physical jobs, maintaining good posture or movements with proper technique is also a crucial skill for avoiding injury. Ironically, white-collar workers who are sedentary throughout the workday may also suffer from long-term health problems due to a lack of physical activity.

Training 
Learning the necessary skills for work is often a complex process in its own right, requiring intentional training. In traditional societies, know-how for different tasks can be passed to each new generation through oral tradition and working under adult guidance. For work that is more specialized and technically complex, however, a more formal system of education is usually necessary. A complete curriculum ensures that a worker in training has some exposure to all major aspects of their specialty, in both theory and practice.

Equipment and technology 

Tool use has been a central aspect of human evolution and is also an essential feature of work. Even in technologically advanced societies, many workers' toolsets still include a number of smaller hand-tools, designed to be held and operated by a single person, often without supplementary power. This is especially true when tasks can be handled by one or a few workers, don't require significant physical power, and are somewhat self-paced, like in many services or handicraft manufacturing.

For other tasks needing large amounts of power, such as in the construction industry, or involving a highly-repetitive set of simple actions, like in mass manufacturing, complex machines can carry out much of the effort. The workers present will focus on more complex tasks, operating controls, or performing maintenance. Over several millennia, invention, scientific discovery, and engineering principles have allowed humans to proceed from creating simple machines that merely redirect or amplify force, through engines for harnessing supplementary power sources, to today's complex, regulated systems that automate many steps within a work process.

In the 20th century, the development of electronics and new mathematical insights led to the creation and widespread adoption of fast, general-purpose computers. Just as mechanization can substitute for the physical labor of many human beings, computers allow for the partial automation of mental work previously carried out by human workers, such as calculations, document transcription, and basic customer service requests. Research and development of related technologies like machine learning and robotics continues into the 21st century.

Beyond tools and machines used to actively perform tasks, workers benefit when other passive elements of their work and environment are designed properly. This includes everything from personal items like workwear and safety gear to features of the workspace itself like furniture, lighting, air quality, and even the underlying architecture.

In society

Organizations 
Even if workers are personally ready to perform their jobs, coordination is required for any effort outside of individual subsistence to succeed. At the level of a small team working on a single task, only cooperation and good communication may be necessary. As the complexity of a work process increases though, requiring more planning or more workers focused on specific tasks, a reliable organization becomes more critical.

Economic organizations often reflect social thought common to their time and place, such as ideas about human nature or hierarchy. These unique organizations can also be historically significant, even forming major pillars of an economic system. In European history, for instance, the decline of guilds and rise of joint-stock companies goes hand-in-hand with other changes, like the growth of centralized states and capitalism.

In industrialized economies, labor unions are another significant organization. In isolation, a worker that is easily replaceable in the labor market has little power to demand better wages or conditions. By banding together and interacting with business owners as a corporate entity, the same workers can claim a larger share of the value created by their labor. While a union does require workers to sacrifice some autonomy in relation to their coworkers, it can grant workers more control over the work process itself in addition to material benefits.

Institutions 
The need for planning and coordination extends beyond individual organizations to society as a whole too. Every successful work project requires effective resource allocation to provide necessities, materials, and investment (such as equipment and facilities). In smaller, traditional societies, these aspects can be mostly regulated through custom, though as societies grow, more extensive methods become necessary.

These complex institutions, however, still have roots in common human activities. Even the free markets of modern capitalist societies rely fundamentally on trade, while command economies, such as in many communist states during the 20th century, rely on a highly bureaucratic and hierarchical form of redistribution.

Other institutions can affect workers even more directly by delimiting practical day-to-day life or basic legal rights. For example, a caste system may restrict families to a narrow range of jobs, inherited from parent to child. In serfdom, a peasant has more rights than a slave but is attached to a specific piece of land and largely under the power of the landholder, even requiring permission to physically travel outside the land-holding. How institutions play out in individual workers' lives can be complex too; in most societies where wage-labor predominates, workers possess equal rights by law and mobility in theory. Without social support or other resources, however, the necessity of earning a livelihood may force a worker to cede some rights and freedoms in fact.

Values 
Societies and subcultures may value work in general, or specific kinds of it, very differently. When social status or virtue is strongly associated with leisure and opposed to tedium, then work itself can become indicative of low social rank and devalued. In the opposite case, a society may hold strongly to a work ethic where work itself is seen as virtuous. For example, German sociologist Max Weber hypothesized that European capitalism originated in a Protestant work ethic, which emerged with the Reformation.

For some, work may hold a spiritual value in addition to any secular notions. Especially in some monastic or mystical strands of several religions, simple manual labor may be held in high regard as a way to maintain the body, cultivate self-discipline and humility, and focus the mind.

Current issues 
The contemporary world economy has brought many changes, overturning some previously widespread labor issues. At the same time, some longstanding issues remain relevant, and other new ones have emerged. One issue that continues despite many improvements is slave labor and human trafficking. Though ideas about universal rights and the economic benefits of free labor have significantly diminished the prevalence of outright slavery, it continues in lawless areas, or in attenuated forms on the margins of many economies.

Another difficulty, which has emerged in most societies as a result of urbanization and industrialization, is unemployment. While the shift from a subsistence economy usually increases the overall productivity of society and lifts many out of poverty, it removes a baseline of material security from those who cannot find employment or other support. Governments have tried a range of strategies to mitigate the problem, such as improving the efficiency of job matching, conditionally providing welfare benefits or unemployment insurance, or even directly overriding the labor market through work-relief programs or a job guarantee. Since a job forms a major part of many workers' self-identity, unemployment can have severe psychological and social consequences beyond the financial insecurity it causes.

One more issue, which may not directly interfere with the functioning of an economy but can have significant indirect effects, is when governments fail to account for work occurring out-of-view from the public sphere. This may be important, uncompensated work occurring everyday in private life; or it may be criminal activity that involves clear but furtive economic exchanges. By ignoring or failing to understand these activities, economic policies can have counter-intuitive effects and cause strains on the community and society.

Workplace

See also 
In modern market-economies:
 Employment
 Profession
 Career
 Volunteering
 Trade union
 Labour economics

Labor issues:
 Karoshi
 Unemployment
 Unpaid work
 Informal economy
 Labor rights
 Minimum wage
 Unfree labor

Related concepts:
 Critique of work
 Problem solving
 Helping behavior
 Ergonomics
 Flow (psychology)
 Occupational stress
 Occupational safety and health
 Refusal of work

Notes

References 

Anthropology
Labour economics
Sociological terminology